The 1994 Minnesota Attorney General election was held on Tuesday, November 8, 1994 to elect the Minnesota Attorney General for a four-year term. Incumbent DFLer  Skip Humphrey ran for reelection to a fourth term, ultimately defeating Republican nominee Sharon Anderson. The election marked the seventh attorney general race in a row won by the DFL since 1970. Humphry won every single county, becoming the first person to do so since Governor Wendell Anderson in 1974. No candidate has done so since, although Governor Arne Carlson won all but three in the adjacent gubernatorial election, and U.S. Senator Amy Klobuchar won all but two in 2012.

Democratic–Farmer–Labor primary 
The primary was held on September 13. Incumbent attorney general Skip Humphrey won the DFL nomination. Humphrey faced only token opposition for renomination from LaRouchite candidates.

Candidates

Nominated in primary 

 Hubert "Skip" Humphrey III, incumbent attorney general, former state senator

Elimated in primary 

 Kent S. Herschbach, LaRouchite perennial candidate, truck driver
 Lewis du Pont Smith, LaRouchite and heir of the du Pont family

Results

Independent-Republican primary 
The primary was held on September 13. Sharon Anderson won the Independent-Republican nomination over Republican Party-endorsed candidate Tom Neuville, an upset attributed to Anderson's "very electable name."

Candidates

Nominated in primary 

 Sharon Anderson, activist, perennial candidate

Elimated in primary 

 Thomas M. Neuville, state senator
 Andrew Olson, LaRouchite farmer

Results

Other candidates

Grassroots Party

Nominee 

 Dean W. Amundson

General election

Results

References 

Attorney General
Minnesota Attorney General elections
Minnesota